The 1973 Chicago Bears season was their 54th regular season completed in the National Football League. The team finished with a 3–11 record, the second worst showing in franchise history until 43 years later in 2016, when the team finished 3–13.

NFL Draft

Roster

Regular season

Schedule

Game summaries

Week 1 vs. Cowboys

Week 8

Standings

References 

Chicago Bears
Chicago Bears seasons
Chicago Bears